IPVS (IP Virtual Server) implements transport-layer load balancing, usually called Layer 4 LAN switching, as part of the Linux kernel. It's configured via the user-space utility  tool.

IPVS is incorporated into the Linux Virtual Server (LVS), where it runs on a host and acts as a load balancer in front of a cluster of real servers.  IPVS can direct requests for TCP- and UDP-based services to the real servers, and make services of the real servers appear as virtual services on a single IP address.  IPVS is built on top of the Netfilter.

IPVS is merged into versions 2.4.x and newer of the Linux kernel mainline.

See also 

 Netfilter and nftables
 Network scheduler

References

External links 
 Source archive
 Virtual Server Configuration Wiki

Internet Protocol based network software
Parallel computing
High-availability cluster computing
Servers (computing)
Routing